Cribb is a surname. Notable people with the surname include:
 Australia
Alan Cribb, botanist and mycologist
Benjamin Cribb, pioneer and politician in Queensland
James Clarke Cribb, politician in Queensland
Joan Cribb, botanist and mycologist
John Cribb, triple murderer
Joseph Cribb
Margaret Cribb, political scientist
Reg Cribb, playwright
Robert Cribb, pioneer and politician in Queensland
Roger Cribb, Australian archaeologist and anthropologist
Thomas Bridson Cribb, politician in Queensland, Australia
Canada;
Ernest Cribb, sailor
 New Zealand;
Bruce Cribb, speedway rider
Jo Cribb, public servant
Ron Cribb, New Zealand rugby union player
 United Kingdom
Guy Cribb, windsurfer
Joe Cribb, numismatist
Joseph Cribb, sculptor
Stan Cribb, footballer
Steve Cribb, disability rights activist and numismatist
Tom Cribb, English bare-knuckle boxer
 United States of America
T. Kenneth Cribb Jr., president of the Intercollegiate Studies Institute and a former Presidential advisor
Fiction
Sergeant Daniel Cribb is the main character in a series of novels by Peter Lovesey
Music
The fictional Cribb brothers are singers in a satirical band, The Hee Bee Gee Bees